Bonheiden is a municipality located in the Belgian province of Antwerp. The municipality comprises the towns of Bonheiden proper and Rijmenam. In 2021, Bonheiden had a total population of 15,177. The total area is 29.27 km2 (11.30 sq mi).

Climate

Notable people

 Sven Nys (1976), cyclo-cross rider
 Niels Albert (1986), cyclo-cross rider
 John Cordier (1942–2002), founder of Telindus
 Luc Van Den Brande (1945), Flemish politician
 Staf Van Eyken (1951), convicted serial killer
 Wouter Van Besien (1972), Flemish politician
 Inge Vervotte (December 1977), Belgian politician
 Dave McCullen (1977), Belgian deejay
 Sofie Van Houtven (1987), footballer
 Koen Casteels (1992), footballer
 Lisa Vaelen (2004), Belgian gymnast

References

External links
 
Official website (Dutch only)

Municipalities of Antwerp Province
Populated places in Antwerp Province